Georgia State Route 5 Business may refer to:

 Georgia State Route 5 Business (Ball Ground): a business route of State Route 5 that partially existed in Ball Ground
 Georgia State Route 5 Business (Blue Ridge): a former business route of State Route 5 that partially existed in Blue Ridge
 Georgia State Route 5 Business (Canton): a business route of State Route 5 that exists in Canton

005 Business